This is a list of association football clubs with multiple consecutive promotions or relegations.

For an association football club to achieve three consecutive promotions is somewhat rare, to achieve subsequent further promotions even rarer. Many football league systems are organised in a pyramid system, allowing league champions and, in many cases, clubs placed immediately behind the champions to achieve promotion, either directly or through a play-off system. To achieve three or more promotions all as league champions, like the now defunct Gretna did from 2004 to 2007, or Chester did from 2010 to 2013 is exceptional.

It is comparably easier for a club to achieve three consecutive relegations, as no particular effort is required. In professional football and, to a lesser extent, in semi-professional and amateur football, this is often caused by financial trouble.

A club that achieves promotion, followed by immediate relegation and a subsequent repeat of this cycle is often described as a Yo-yo club.

Note:

 Dissolved and reformed clubs, and clubs relegated due to financial irregularities are not included in this list.

Clubs

The list is sorted by number of promotions or relegations followed by the alphabetical order of location:

Promotions
Clubs with three or more consecutive promotions:

Relegations
Clubs with three or more consecutive relegations:

Promotions and relegations
Yo-yo clubs, meaning clubs that consecutively bounce between two leagues and have, in the process, switched leagues five or more times:

Promotions and/or relegations
Clubs with four or more consecutive promotions and/or relegations, spread over three or more divisions:

Notes

References

Association football club records and statistics